A studentship is a type of academic scholarship.

United States

In the US a studentship is similar to a scholarship but involves summer work on a research project. The amount paid to the recipient is normally tax-free, but the recipient is required to fulfill work requirements. Types of studentships vary among universities and countries. Studentships are sometimes known as teaching and research assistantships. Studentships are almost exclusively awarded to research students, preferably at the Ph.D. level.

United Kingdom

In the UK, a 'studentship' is a common name for a PhD scholarship. At Christ Church, Oxford, however, the term studentship has the same meaning as the term fellowship has at other colleges, i.e. the office of a student or the duration thereof, or the students collectively.

References

Scholarships